Machynlleth Community Hospital is a health facility in Heol Maengwyn, Machynlleth, Powys, Wales. It is managed by the Powys Teaching Health Board.

History
The facility has its origins in the Machynlleth Union Workhouse which opened in 1860. After serving as a Red Cross Hospital during the First World War, it was converted into a hospital for tuberculosis patients, re-opening as the King Edward VII Memorial Hospital in 1920. It joined the National Health Service as the Machynlleth Chest Hospital in 1948 and subsequently evolved to become a community hospital. An upgrade to the hospital costing £7.8 million and involving three new extensions is scheduled to complete in 2022.

References

Hospitals in Powys
Hospitals established in 1860
1860 establishments in Wales
Hospital buildings completed in 1860
NHS hospitals in Wales
Powys Teaching Health Board